Nijat Rahimov (born 13 August 1993 in Baku, Azerbaijan) is an Azerbaijani-born naturalized Kazakhstani weightlifter. He represented  Kazakhstan  at the 2016 Summer Olympics, in the category of 77 kg, he placed first, winning the gold medal and setting a new world record with a clean and jerk lift of 214 kilograms. In 2022, the medal was stripped and he was banned when it was revealed he substituted urine samples.

Career
Rahimov won a gold medal for Azerbaijan at the 2010 Summer Youth Olympics and a silver at the 2013 Junior World Weightlifting Championships.

At the 2013 Summer Universiade he served as a flag bearer for Azerbaijan. Rahimov was suspended for 2 years from June 2013 after testing positive for anabolic steroids. An out of competition doping test found prior use of oxandrolone and dehydromethyltestosterone.

Rahimov won a gold medal for Kazakhstan at the 2016 Olympics in the 77 kg weight class, setting a world record in clean and jerk (214 kg).

In 2022, he was stripped of his gold medal from the 2016 Olympics.  The Egyptian weightlifter, who finished third in the 2016 Olympics, has made statements against him.

See also
List of Olympic medalists in weightlifting
List of Youth Olympic Games gold medalists who won Olympic gold medals

References

Azerbaijani male weightlifters
Kazakhstani male weightlifters
Sportspeople from Baku
1993 births
World Weightlifting Championships medalists
Living people
Weightlifters at the 2010 Summer Youth Olympics
Weightlifters at the 2016 Summer Olympics
Medalists at the 2016 Summer Olympics
World record holders in Olympic weightlifting
Olympic weightlifters of Kazakhstan
Olympic gold medalists for Kazakhstan
Olympic medalists in weightlifting
Doping cases in weightlifting
Kazakhstani sportspeople in doping cases
Youth Olympic gold medalists for Azerbaijan